Estadio El Teniente, also known as Estadio El Teniente-Codelco for sponsorship reasons, is a multi-purpose stadium in Rancagua, Chile. It is currently used mostly for football matches. The stadium can fit 14,087 people and was built in 1945 with the name Braden Copper Company Stadium (Estadio Braden Copper Co.). The stadium is home to football club O'Higgins, which is based in Rancagua.

The stadium hosted seven matches of 1962 FIFA World Cup, where played matches of the group stage and quarter-finals.

In 2013, the stadium was renovated for hosting the 2015 Copa América, to be played in Chile. Two matches of the group stage will be played in this stadium.

History

Construction

The stadium, since its construction, was owned by the U.S. copper mining company Braden Copper Company, which operated the mineral-extraction complex "El Teniente".

The designation of the Braden Copper Stadium to host matches in the 1962 FIFA World Cup was due to an emergency. Indeed, the 1960 Valdivia earthquake severely damaged or destroyed facilities in some of the originally-designated host cities of the FIFA World Cup in 1962 including Talca, Concepción, Talcahuano and Valdivia, which caused the original schedule to be discarded and forced its almost complete modification. Further, Antofagasta and Valparaíso were deterred from fulfilling their offers to host because they could not feasibly construct self-funded stadiums, a condition that had been imposed by the Federation due to its own lack of resources. However, given the bleak outlook for the organization, the U.S. mining interests allowed the use of their stadium in Rancagua.

Nationalisation of copper

The Government of Chile acquired in 1967 51% of the shares of Braden Copper Co., as part of the general nationalization of copper, which concluded in 1971. Therefore, the ownership and management of the "Estadio Braden Copper" passed to the state-owned corporation Codelco Chile, which led to the name change to the current one.

New stadium

On May 21, 2008, the then-president Michelle Bachelet announced the "Red de Estadios para el Bicentenario", a programme in which w new stadiums were built and upgrades planned for others, among which was the Estadio El Teniente. However, remodeling El Teniente was not executed during the term of Bachelet, although this was projected, due to the 2010 Chilean earthquake.

On September 2, 2012, President Sebastian Piñera announced in Rancagua the final draft of the plans for remodelling the stadium, which will have a capacity of 15 000 spectators. Construction began on February 19, 2013, and delivery is planned for early 2014.

The Asociación Nacional de Fútbol Profesional (ANFP) announced in December 2012 that El Teniente had been selected to host the 2015 Copa América, along with Santiago, Antofagasta, La Serena, Valparaíso, Viña del Mar, Concepción and Temuco. Host venue contested with the city of Talca, however Rancagua was chosen due  to its closer proximity to the Chilean capital.

Inaugural match

In the inaugural match, O'Higgins played against Lanús for the week 6 of the 2014 Copa Libertadores. The final result was 0–0,
marking the elimination of the club from the competition, as they needed a victory to advance to the next round.

Sectors of the stadium
The stadium has 5 sectors since her renovation, the Palco has 375 seats, and the totality of the other four sectors are 13,464.
 Angostura (North Side)
 Marquesina (West Side)
 Andes (East Side)
 Rengo (South Side)
 Palco (VIP suite)

1962 World Cup

The Estadio El Teniente hosted seven games during the 1962 FIFA World Cup, every game of Group 4 and a quarterfinal.

Teams which played in this stadium for the 1962 FIFA World Cup:

Matches

Group 4

Quarter-finals

Chile national football team matches

The Estadio El Teniente has hosted four games of the Chile national football team, against New Zealand in 2006, Guatemala in 2008, and the United States in 2015, as well as a pre-2015 Copa América friendly match against El Salvador.

2015 Copa América

The fixture schedule was announced on 11 November 2014, and two games were played in the Estadio El Teniente for the 2015 Copa América, playing here 4 of 12 countries of the tournament. Both matches were part of the group stage.

Teams which played in this stadium for the 2015 Copa América:

Group stage

Attendances

Note: This table only includes attendances since the remodeling of the stadium, that was officially opened in July 2014 in a match against Universidad de Chile.

 1. ANFP punishment to O'Higgins playing without public one home match by the racism acts to Emilio Rentería in a match on the stadium.

Transport connections

Bus
Terminal O'Higgins is the principal bus stop of the city, and the stadium is 1.05 miles (1.7 km) away following the Rancagua avenues.

The Tur Bus terminal at Rancagua is 1.55 miles (2.35 km) away of the stadium.

Bus lines (micros) with a stop close to El Teniente are:

 Trans O'Higgins lines:

 101, 102 and 103 – Circunvalación
 201, 202, and 203 – Isabel Riquelme
 301, 302, 303 and 304 – Cachapoal
 403 – Manzanal

Tramway
The stadium is 1.18 miles (1.9 km) away from the Estación Rancagua (Metrotrén).

Airport

The city only has the Aeródromo de la Independencia, but receives only the private jets and Chilean Army flights. The nearest international airport is the Comodoro Arturo Merino Benítez International Airport, in Santiago.

Images

References

El Teniente
El Teniente
1962 FIFA World Cup stadiums
El Teniente
Sports venues in O'Higgins Region
Multi-purpose stadiums in Chile
Rancagua
Sports venues completed in 1947